May Hallatt (born Marie Effie Hullatt; 1 May 1876 – 20 May 1969) was an English actress, born in Scarborough. 
Baptised at St Michael on the Mount, Lincoln, on 13 Jan 1884 she was the daughter of William Henry Hallatt, actor, and Carrie Sydney.

A number of published sources incorrectly name her as mother of the actor Neil Hallett.

Career

Often cast in eccentric roles, within her 30-year career, she was known for Painted Boats (1945), Black Narcissus (1947) and Separate Tables (1958).

In Terence Rattigan's Separate Tables, she played Miss Meacham in the original West End, Broadway productions and the film versions.

Personal life and death
May Hallatt died on 20 May 1969 in London, England, aged 93.

Filmography

References

External links
 

1876 births
1969 deaths
English stage actresses
English film actresses
English television actresses
Actors from Scarborough, North Yorkshire
20th-century English actresses